The 2002 Kraft Nabisco Championship was a women's professional golf tournament, held March 28–31 at Mission Hills Country Club in Rancho Mirage, California. This was the 31st edition of the Kraft Nabisco Championship, and the twentieth as a major championship.

Defending champion Annika Sörenstam shot a final round 68 to win the second of her three titles at this event, one stroke ahead of runner-up and compatriot Liselotte Neumann; it was the fourth of Sörenstam's ten major titles. The co-leaders after 54 holes were Sörenstam, Neumann, and Karrie Webb, the 2000 champion.

Through 2017, this is the sole successful title defense at this major championship. Before it became a major in 1983, Sandra Post won consecutively in 1978 and 1979.

Past champions in the field

Made the cut

Source:

Missed the cut

Source:

Final leaderboard
Sunday, March 31, 2002

Source:

Amateurs: Lorena Ochoa (–3), Aree Song (+11), Naree Song (+11), Meredith Duncan (+19).

References

External links
Golf Observer leaderboard

Chevron Championship
Golf in California
Sports competitions in California
Kraft Nabisco Championship
Kraft Nabisco Championship
Kraft Nabisco Championship
Kraft Nabisco Championship
Women's sports in California